Ganeshpuri may mean:

 A village named Ganeshpuri in Maharashtra, India
 Vajreshwari Temple in the village
 The Siddha Yoga ashram by the village